Billy Munro may refer to:

 Morndi Munro, or Billy Munro, last fluent speaker of the Unggumi language of Western Australia
 Billy Munro (rugby union) (1918–1970), Scottish rugby union player